National Robotics Competition (NRC) is a robotics competition jointly organised by Singapore Science Centre and Duck Learning Education, with support from the Ministry of Education and the Agency for Science, Technology and Research.  It aims to help nurture a new generation of youths with interest in Science, Technology, Engineering and Mathematics (STEM) to aspire in improving the lives of people, and encourages students to develop problem solving skills, entrepreneurial skills, creative thinking skills and team spirit.

History 
National Robotics Competition was first organised in 1999 as National Junior Robotics Competition (NJRC) with 167 teams from 70 schools. In the competition, teams of not more than 5 students build a robot using the Lego Mindstorms robotics system. Competitors are divided into three categories: Upper Primary Division, for Primary 3 to Primary 6 students, Secondary Division for secondary or equivalent level, and Tertiary Division, for 1st and 2nd year ITE/JC/Poly students. In 2007, 13 schools participated in the competition, sending a total of 37 teams.

In 2016, a holistic review is made to the competition following an announcement during the closing ceremony of the competition that year. NJRC was officially renamed as National Robotics Competition (NRC) in 2017. An additional category for children aged six to eight years is added, along with other new elements such as the robotic arm hackathon.

National Junior Robotics Competition Milestones

2022 

 Raffles Girls' School won the Championship in the Secondary (Junior High) Category for the first time, also winning the Best Presentation Award (1st) and Best Content Award (1st, 2nd).
 Raffles Institution won the Championship in the Tertiary (Senior High) Category for the second time, also winning the Judges Award (Best Learning Journey), Best Presentation Award (3rd), Best Content Award (1st, 2nd), and Best Robot Performance Award (1st, 2nd).

2017 

 The introduction of the Robot Arm Category, won by Raffles Girls' School

2015
 Raffles Institution won the championship in the Tertiary category for the first time, also winning the Best Programming Award (1st), Best Research Award (1st), Best Presentation (2nd) and Best Journal (2nd).

2013
 Mission for primary school requires the use of colour sensor.
 Missions are similar to challenges in WRO 2013
 Surprise mission in primary school preliminaries day 1 needs two colour sensors; one for detecting colour of cubes, one for detecting colour of bins (which was decided through throwing of dice)
 Nan Hua Primary School won the championship in the Primary School category for the first time.
 ITE College Central won the championship in the Tertiary category for the first time.

2008
 The first mission of the challenge involves knocking down drink cans of 330ml each.
 The mission also involves a second mission which is a secret mission. They are made known to the Pri and Sec Sch teams a few days before the actual challenge. The tertiary teams only know the secret mission on the actual day of the challenge.
 10th anniversary of National Junior Robotics Competition
 Hwa Chong Institution won the National Junior Robotics Competition Championship for 2 years consecutively in the Tertiary Division, and also clinched the Best Robot Performance Award in the Tertiary Division.
 River Valley High won the championship for secondary division for the first time.
 Rulang Primary School reclaimed their status as the robotics champion for upper primary division from Chua Chu Kang Primary School, which won the championship for 2006 and 2007.

2007
 The introduction of the Lego Mindstorms NXT system
 The mission had two storeys
 The teams had to present a video footage to showcase the team's entire learning journey instead of the usual journal
 The introduction of new category involving ITE/JC/Poly(1st year & 2nd year) students
 For the first time in National Junior Robotics Competition's history, the judges allowed Admiralty Secondary School to have a rerun for the mission. This was because the playfield was not up to standard as structural errors were experienced. The playfield which Admiralty Secondary School ran on had its deformities, resulting in the playfield's base to be unbalanced. Thus, many of Admiralty Secondary School's robots were unable to complete the missions during the first run. It was after several deliberations and negotiations before the decision was announced to allow Admiralty Secondary School a second run for the mission so as to make sure the teams are playing under fair grounds.
 Chua Chu Kang Primary School won the championship award for the upper primary category for 2 years consecutively, with full marks for the surprise mission during the Grand Finals.

2006
 Robots have to travel in 5 cm deep waters
 The mission had an elevator
 The playing field was constructed using acrylic
 Admiralty Secondary School won the National Junior Robotics Competition Championship for 4 years consecutively.

2005
 The mission had three storeys 
 The mission had stairs
 Admiralty Secondary School won the National Junior Robotics Competition Championship for 3 years consecutively.

2004
 Teams were given 7 missions to work on
 Mobile phones were not allowed to be used by competitors during competition
 Teams were not provided with the playing field to use at their own home ground. Only selected schools were provided 
 All teams in the Primary school section achieved zero points in the surprise mission
 "The Best Robot Performance Award" was decided from the interview sessions.
  Admiralty Secondary School won the National Junior Robotics Competition Championship for 2 years consecutively.

2003
 The mission features double level playfields

2002
 Non-competitors were not allowed in the pit areas to prevent unfair advantages
 The playing mat was made out of printed paper and not black sticky tape
 The "Surprise mission" was revealed on the Finals itself.

2001
 Teams were allowed to use two light sensors and one rotation sensor
 The "Surprise mission" was introduced. The surprise mission was revealed the day before the Finals.

2000
 Teams were given objects to collect and deliver
 The competition had two missions
 The mission had ramps

1999
 First held at the World Trade Centre (current Harbourfront Centre)

References

External links 
 Description Website on NRC

Education in Singapore